Washington Township is a township in Chautauqua County, Kansas, USA.  As of the 2000 census, its population was 87.

Geography
According to the USGS, it contains three cemeteries: Burton, Riley and Todd.

The streams of California Creek, Cedar Creek, Davis Creek, Deadman Creek, East Branch Grant Creek, Middle Caney Creek, North Caney Creek and West Branch Grant Creek run through this township.

References
 USGS Geographic Names Information System (GNIS)

External links
 US-Counties.com
 City-Data.com

Townships in Chautauqua County, Kansas
Townships in Kansas